The Whatcom County Executive is the head of the executive branch of Whatcom County, Washington. The position is subject to four-year terms (with a term limit of 3) and is a nonpartisan office.

History

County voters approved the adoption of a home-rule charter for Whatcom County on November 7, 1978, creating the position of a seven-member county council. The position of county executive was created in 1996. Prior to the adoption, the county government was led by three commissioners elected at-large.

Duties
The Executive submits legislation to the Whatcom County Council for consideration. The Executive has veto power over ordinances passed by the council. The Council requires a vote of five of the seven council members to override the Executive's veto.

List of executives

See also
King County Executive
Pierce County Executive
Snohomish County Executive

References

Notes

Citations

External links
Whatcom County Executive

Executive
County officials in Washington (state)
County executives in the United States